Hana is a borough of the city of Sandnes in Rogaland county, Norway. The  borough is located just east of the city centre of Sandnes on the east side of the Gandsfjorden.  It has a population (in 2016) of 8,196.

Hanafjellet mountain is located in the northeastern part of the borough. Hana has a tourist attraction of a cave that was used by army during World War II.  The local sports team is Hana IL.  Hana Church is located in the borough also.  The village of Vatne is in Hana as is the Vatneleiren military base.

References

Boroughs and neighbourhoods of Sandnes